Shemaroo TV is an Indian Hindi-GEC free-to-air television channel owned by Shemaroo Entertainment Media Network. The channel was launched on 1 May 2020 for the entertainment of Indian audience.

Current shows

Original show
 Waah bhai Waah
 Crime World

Acquired shows
 Jai Jai Jai Bajarang Bali
 Shemaroo Bhakti
Maharana PratapVighnaharta GaneshGhar Ek SpanaVeer ShivajiSiya Ke RamMata Ki ChowkiShree KrishnaDevon Ke Dev...MahadevUpcoming shows
 May I Come In Madam Bahu Hamari Rajni Kant Hum Ne Li Hai...Shapath  Tumhari Paakhi 
 Dream Girl - Ek Ladki Deewani Si Gustakh Dil Naagarjuna - Ek Yoddha Piya Rangrezz Do Dil Ek Jaan Ghulaam Saam Daam Dand Bhed Muskaan Kya Haal, Mr. Paanchal? Nimki Mukhiya Nimki Vidhayak Excuse Me Maadam Sufiyana Pyaar Mera Tera Mera Saath Rahe Saath Nibhaana Saathiya Jag Janani Maa Vaishno Devi - Kahani Mata Rani Ki Mahabharat Tu Mera Hero Shaka Laka Boom Boom Shararat Son Pari Miley Jab Hum Tum Pyaar Kii Ye Ek Kahaani Dill Mill Gayye Shaadi Mubarak Saath Nibhaana Saathiya 2 Raja Ki Aayegi Baraat Sapnon Se Bhare Naina Pyaar Ka Dard Hai Meetha Meetha Pyaara Pyaara Kyunki Saas Bhi Kabhi Bahu Thi Kahaani Ghar Ghar Kii Kasautii Zindagii Kay Kumkum – Ek Pyara Sa Bandhan Kaahin Kissii Roz Des Mein Niklla Hoga Chand Dil Se Di Dua... Saubhagyavati Bhava?Former shows
Former original shows
 Jurm Aur Jazbaat (Season 1)Formerly acquired shows
 Zabaan Sambhalke The Great Indian Laughter Challenge Ssshhhh...Phir Koi Hai Haunted Nights Bharti Ka Show Geet - Hui Sabse Parayi Ek Boond Ishq Suhani Si Ek Ladki Kalash - Ek Vishwaas Jiji Maa Ganesh Leela Dil Se Di Dua... Saubhagyavati Bhava? Siya Ke Ram Naamkarann Mata Ki Chowki Doli Saja Ke Veer Shivaji Ghar....Ek Sapna Parvarrish 
 Guardian: The Lonely and Great God Kis Desh Mein Hai Meraa DilDevon Ke Dev... MahadevSai BabaUttar Ramayan''

References

External links
 www.shemaroome.com 
 Shemaroo TV on YouTube 

Hindi-language television channels in India
Television channels and stations established in 2020
2020 establishments in Maharashtra
Hindi-language television stations